Abid Ali Abid (Urdu/Persian: سید عابد علی عابد) was a Pakistani Urdu and Persian poet and educator who was born on 17 September 1906 in Dera Ismail Khan, British India  and died in Lahore, Pakistan on 20 January 1971.

Life 
He wrote books on literary criticism in Urdu and Persian. He also initiated and edited several literary journals, one of which is Sahifa-Lahore. He also was one of the initial drama writers and feature writers at the newly established Radio Pakistan Lahore in the late 1940s and 1950s. He survived three heart attacks but succumbed to the fourth in 1971.

Selected work 

 Story writing of films like the first talkie, Heer Ranjha (1931)

Books and poetry 
For a detailed list see 
 Talismaat (The Magic), Urdu fiction, Hashmi Book Depot Lahore, Pakistan
 Shahbaz Khan, Urdu fiction, Sang-e-Meel Publications, Pakistan
 Main Kabhi Ghazal na Kahta, Urdu poetry, Sang-e-Meel Publications, Pakistan
 Usool-E-Intequade-Adabiyat (Rules of Literary Criticism)
  Shar-i-Iqbal, (A criticism of Iqbal's Poetry),  / 969351436X, Sang-e-Meel      Publications, Pakistan
 Political Theory of the Shi'ties, Part of the history of Muslim philosophy.
 Asloob, an Urdu book on literary criticism
 Albayan, an Urdu book on literary criticism
 Al Badeeh (Mohsinaat e Shairi Ka Intaqadi Jaiza): (Criticism  of the Characteristics of Urdu poetry)

References

External links 
   A link to Abid's poetry
 Urdu Poetry Selection

1906 births
1971 deaths
Urdu-language poets from Pakistan
Persian-language poets
People from British India
20th-century Pakistani poets